Union Stadium is a municipal multi-sports facility situated in Westbury, Johannesburg, South Africa. It is mostly used for football matches.

References

Soccer venues in South Africa
Sports venues in Johannesburg
Multi-purpose stadiums in South Africa